Loon Mountain is a mountain in Lincoln and Livermore, New Hampshire, in Grafton County. It is in the White Mountain National Forest.

The  mountain is known for Loon Mountain Ski Resort, which, like most New England mountain resorts, has expanded into an all-season recreation area.

Geography
Each of the three peaks is the summit of one or more chairlifts belonging to the ski resort.

To the southwest of Loon Mountain is  Russell Mountain.

The north side of Loon Mountain drains via Boyle Brook and Loon Pond Brook to the East Branch of the Pemigewasset River. To the west of the South Peak, Horner Brook drains directly to the Pemigewasset River. The southern slopes of Loon Mountain drain via Talford Brook to Eastman Brook and then into the Pemigewasset, which flows south to the Merrimack River and ultimately the Gulf of Maine.

References

External links
 Loon Mountain Ski Resort
 Loon Mountain Ski Patrol

Mountains of Grafton County, New Hampshire
Mountains of New Hampshire
Lincoln, New Hampshire